Elattoneura, the African threadtails, is a genus of damselflies in the family Platycnemididae. They were formerly placed in genus Prodasineura, but form a distinct clade. The adults are smallish and delicately built damselflies, and their males have very wide heads (cf. Platycnemis and Copera).  The adults are typically found in sheltered locations beside or over running water, though a few prefer calmer water with much detritus. There appears to be two groups with differing habitat preferences. Those with pruinose (i.e. frosty grey or white) faces and mostly blue eyes occupy watercourses in open terrain, while those with black or brightly coloured faces are found along forested streams.

Species
There are over 30 species which include:

Elattoneura acuta
Elattoneura analis
Elattoneura atkinsoni
Elattoneura aurantiaca
Elattoneura aurifex – goldsmith threadtail
Elattoneura balli
Elattoneura caesia – jungle threadtail
Elattoneura campioni
Elattoneura cellularis
Elattoneura centrafricana
Elattoneura centralis
Elattoneura coomansi
Elattoneura dorsalis
Elattoneura erythromma
Elattoneura frenulata – sooty threadtail
Elattoneura girardi
Elattoneura glauca – common threadtail, grey threadtail
Elattoneura josemorai
Elattoneura khalidi
Elattoneura lapidaria – rock threadtail
Elattoneura leucostigma – smoky-winged threadtail
Elattoneura lliba
Elattoneura longispina
Elattoneura mauros
Elattoneura morini
Elattoneura nigerrima
Elattoneura nigra – black threadtail
Elattoneura nihari
Elattoneura oculata – two-spotted threadtail
Elattoneura pasquinii
Elattoneura pluotae
Elattoneura pruinosa
Elattoneura souteri
Elattoneura tarbotonorum – stout threadtail
Elattoneura tenax
Elattoneura tetrica
Elattoneura vrijdaghi

References

Platycnemididae
Zygoptera genera
Taxonomy articles created by Polbot